Ackeel Applewhaite (born 17 July 1999) is a Bajan footballer who plays as a midfielder for Paradise and the Barbados national team.

Career
Applewhaite first started playing football at St Giles Primary, before playing for club sides Benfica and Paradise. Trials at English sides Crystal Palace and Barnet followed, but due to work permit and funding issues, Applewhaite was unable to sign professionally with the latter.

Following spells with Antiguan sides Hoppers and Parham, as well as with boyhood club Paradise, Applewhaite spent time in Finland with Kemi Kings.

Career statistics

Club

International 

Scores and results list Barbados goal tally first, score column indicates score after each Applewhaite goal.

References

External links
 
 Ackeel Applewhaite at Caribbean Football Database

1999 births
Living people
Sportspeople from Bridgetown
Barbadian footballers
Barbadian expatriate footballers
Barbados international footballers
Barbados youth international footballers
Barbados under-20 international footballers
Association football midfielders
Antigua and Barbuda Premier Division players
Hoppers F.C. players
Paradise FC (Barbados) players
Parham F.C. players
Barbadian expatriate sportspeople in Antigua and Barbuda
Expatriate footballers in Antigua and Barbuda
Expatriate footballers in Finland